Albertville station (French: Gare d'Albertville) is a railway station in Albertville, Savoie, Southeastern France. The station, opened on 27 October 1879 by the Chemins de fer de Paris à Lyon et à la Méditerranée (PLM), is located on both the railway from Saint-Pierre-d'Albigny to Bourg-Saint-Maurice and from Annecy to Albertville. Train services at Albertville are operated by the SNCF.

Train services

The following services call at Albertville as of 2022:
Regional services (TER Auvergne-Rhône-Alpes) Chambéry - St-Pierre-d'Albigny - Albertville - Bourg-Saint-Maurice
High speed services (Thalys) Amsterdam - Brussels - Chambéry - Bourg-Saint-Maurice (Winter only)

References

Railway stations in Savoie
Railway stations in France opened in 1879